Harnett County Training School, also known as Harnett High School, is a historic school complex for African-American students located at Dunn, Harnett County, North Carolina. The complex was built between 1922 and 1956, and consists of one two-story and five single-story brick buildings. They include a gable front combined Gymnasium/Auditorium (1948); the two-story, 14 teacher, flat-roofed, Colonial Revival-style Rosenwald-funded Harnett County Training School (1922); a detached brick boiler room (1950); two, one-story, flat-roofed Library and Office Building and Cafeteria buildings (1956); and a one-story, flat-roofed Rosenwald-funded classroom annex added in 1927, now designated the Education Building.

It was listed on the National Register of Historic Places in 2014.

References

Rosenwald schools in North Carolina
African-American history of North Carolina
High schools in North Carolina
School buildings on the National Register of Historic Places in North Carolina
Colonial Revival architecture in North Carolina
School buildings completed in 1922
Museums in Harnett County, North Carolina
National Register of Historic Places in Harnett County, North Carolina
1922 establishments in North Carolina